Kenneth Agyei Kuranchie (born in Tepa, Ashanti Region on 5 August 1969) is a Ghanaian journalist and former board member of the National Media Commission. He is known publicly as a member of the New Patriotic Party of Ghana.

Early life 
Kuranchie was born on 5 August 1969 in Tepa, Ashanti Region. He studied at St. Mary's International School in Sunyani, Brong-Ahafo Region, Opoku Ware Secondary School, the University of Ghana and Mountcrest University in Accra for his LLB.

Career 
He started practicing journalism at the P&P entertainment newspaper, and subsequently at Guide newspaper (now known as Daily Guide). He also worked at The Ghanaian Chronicle. He then set up his own paper, The Daily Searchlight.

In 2013, Kuranchie was convicted of criminal contempt for a publication in his newspaper Daily Searchlight and not showing remorse, and sentenced to 10 days imprisonment by the Supreme Court.

He is an author of several books including 'Principles of Applied and Practical Journalism (2019), as well as the children's books "Journey to Ada", "The Rabbit, The Sparrow and The Lizard", "In Search of Vengeance" and "The Story of Fate".

"Journey to Ada", and "The Rabbit, The Sparrow and The Lizard" have been accredited by Ghana's Commission for Curriculum and Assessment (NACCA) as supplementary readers for primary schools in Ghana.

Politics 
In June 2020 Kuranchie contested in the Parliamentary Primaries of the New Patriotic Party to represent the Okaikoi North Constituency in Ghana's parliamentary elections but lost to Fuseini Issah the incumbent member of parliament at the time.

Personal life 
Kuranchie is married with four children.

References 

Ghanaian journalists
Living people
New Patriotic Party politicians
People from Ashanti Region
1969 births